Mamadanlu (also Romanized as Māmdānlū; also known as Bahādorkhān) is a village in Dorungar Rural District, Now Khandan District, Dargaz County, Razavi Khorasan Province, Iran. At the 2006 census, its population was 201, in 54 families.

References 

Populated places in Dargaz County